Woody Gap is a mountain ridge gap in northern Georgia where the Appalachian Trail crosses State Highway 60. Perched at 3,160 ft altitude, the gap affords scenic vistas of Yahoola Valley below. The trailhead is open to the public year-round. 

The mountain pass is named in honor of Arthur Woody, an early conservationist.

References

External links

Sherpa's Guide - Woody Gap
Georgia Trails - Woody Gap to Neal's Gap
About North Georgia - Arthur Woody

Mountains on the Appalachian Trail
Geography of Union County, Georgia
Geography of Lumpkin County, Georgia